In atomic physics, a spin-destruction (or spin-disorientation) collision is a physical impact where the spin angular momentum of an atom is irretrievably scrambled.

This type of collision can be a significant spin relaxation mechanism for polarized alkali metal vapor. In particular, the relaxation rate of alkali metal atoms in SERF atomic magnetometers is dominated by spin-destruction collisions.

References

Atomic physics